An intrusive suite is a group of plutons related in time and space. All rocks in an intrusive suite result from the same magma-producing event.

See also

 Extrusive rock

References

Igneous petrology